Zaret is a surname. Notable people with the surname include:

Daniel Zaret (1891–1984), Russian-born American citizen and educator
Eli Zaret (born 1950), American sports broadcaster and journalist
Hy Zaret (1907–2007), American lyricist and composer 
Kenneth Zaret, American biologist